Reversal of Fortune is a 2005 Showtime documentary film that asks the question "What would a homeless person do if they were given $100,000?"

Plot
The documentary has its roots in a question that co-director and co-executive producer Wayne Powers had while being asked for some money by a homeless person:   What would happen if I gave him a million dollars (later dropped to 100,000) and the free will to do what he wanted with it?  Would it turn his life around? With enough money to get a home, car, license, would he get a job?  He took the idea to Showtime, where he had written-directed-executive produced the limited series Out of Order, and they said yes immediately.  The only limits would be that the person chosen would have to pass a psychiatric evaluation and have a clean drug test.  The production company PB&J Television produced the documentary.  On her show, Oprah Winfrey called it "a fascinating social experiment".

It begins with the introduction of Ted Rodrigue, a homeless man living under a bridge in California. He begins by describing an average day of "survival" for him, which consists of collecting cans and bottles for recycling in order to eat, buy cigarettes, and beer for the day. He informs the audience that an average day brings in about $25, while a good day might see as much as $35.  Ted reflects on the better days of his life, when his mother (a former alcoholic) and sisters accepted him. He is shown placing a collect call to his mother, ultimately having the charges denied by his mother. Ted blames his homelessness and lack of family support on their prejudice against him for being homeless and an undesirable childhood. Ted describes his mother as a "bar whore" who often brought strange men home from the bar on the weekends and that at the age of 12, he was given his first beer by his mother at one of her many social gatherings.

His ability to "do as he pleases" by not having to answer to any authority figures, keeps him on the streets. Ted informs the filmmakers that he takes a lot of pride in his bicycle and is shown washing it at a car wash, although it has been over three months since he had a "real" shower. Through his recycling, Ted has befriended an 18-year-old Latino male named Michael (Mike), who works at the recycling plant.

The film shows Ted doing his daily dumpster-dive, collecting cans for the day's food, cigarettes and beer, when he finds a briefcase amongst the rubbish. Ted stops to brush it off and opens it up slowly and finds that it is stuffed with cash.  A note atop the money reads "What would a homeless person do if he were given $100,000?" Shocked and in tears, Ted comes to the realization that he is the recipient of a significant amount of money.

Ted almost immediately buys a new bicycle, rents a motel room and takes his buddy Mike to an amusement park. The word gets out among the homeless community and Ted, who once couldn't find a girlfriend due to his poor dental hygiene, now enjoys female companionship in his motel room. As soon as Ted notifies his mother and sisters of his attainment of wealth, they begin to take his calls and his mother invites him to stay with her until he finds his own residence. The family is shown discussing how they are concerned for Ted's welfare.

A week after finding the money, and having spent over $2,000, Ted is still in the motel and is asked to speak with an advocate for the homeless. The counselor asks Ted what he thinks about having the money, to which Ted replies that he really hasn't thought about it much and that he has too much time on his hands now since he no longer has to recycle. Ted makes plans to leave for Sacramento to stay with his mother, but before leaving, he buys Mike a car and promises to fly his lady friend to Sacramento once he gets there and settled, exclaiming as he gets into the van to leave for the airport "bang 'em and leave 'em", referring to his recent activities with the woman.

The following weeks find Ted frequenting at the local bar, his spending averaging $10,000 a week. He then purchases a $35,000 Dodge Ram and another truck for one of his recently acquired girlfriends, rents an apartment and buys furniture. The filmmakers then request that he meet with a financial planner. Ted meets with him, but firmly announces to him that he has no intentions of working and does not wish to plan ahead as he is only concerned with today. Ted states his belief that the financial planner is only after his money and rips up his card.

His sisters repeatedly try to convince Ted to seek employment, although he still believes he is "set for life". By this time, Ted has become resentful to the film producers for giving him the money. The film then ends telling the viewer that, six months after finding the money, Ted refuses to disclose his latest bank balance; however, his sisters fear that it is less than $5,000.

On a December 1, 2006 airing of The Oprah Winfrey Show entitled: "Are You Ready For a Windfall?", Ted and filmmaker Wayne Powers were on the program to promote the documentary and speak on their account of the experiment. When asked by Oprah how much of the $100,000 he still had, Ted replied "none." Ted also mentioned that he is homeless again, and content with his current circumstances.

As of July 2007, Ted was back in Pasadena and working for the same recycling plant shown in the film.

References
2. https://factswt.com/a-homeless-person-was-given-100000-which-he-blew-in-less-than-6-months/

External links 
 

2005 television films
2005 films
2005 documentary films
Documentary films about homelessness in the United States
Showtime (TV network) documentary films